Angelo Andrea Matarazzo (born 22 November 1956) is a Brazilian entrepreneur, radio host and politician, member of the Social Democratic Party (PSD). He is grandson of Andrea Matarazzo, grand-nephew of Count Francesco Matarazzo, nephew of Ciccillo Matarazzo and brother of the etiquette and behavior journalist Claudia Matarazzo.

Biography
From 1991 to 1992, he was special assistant of the Ministry of Education and Culture. After that, he was Secretary of Industrial Politics of the Ministry of Industry, Trade and Tourism between 1992 and 1993. During Mário Covas administration in São Paulo, he became State Secretary of Energy and president of São Paulo Energetic Company.

Matarazzo was Secretary of Industrial Politics during the government of Itamar Franco, Secretary of Communication of Government of the Presidency of the Republic (1999–2001) and Brazilian Ambassador to Italy (2001–2003) in the government of Fernando Henrique Cardoso.

After FHC presidency, Matarazzo was Sub-Mayor of the Subprefecture of the São Paulo district of Sé, Municipal Secretary of Coordination of Subprefectures, during the administration of Mayors José Serra and Gilberto Kassab, and State Secretary of Culture of Governors Alberto Goldman and Geraldo Alckmin.

In the 2012 election, Matarazzo was the second most voted City Councillor in Brazil with 117,617.

He left PSDB on 18 March 2016, two days before the party primaries to elect the candidate for Mayor of São Paulo in 2016.

On 30 March 2016, Matarazzo joined the Social Democratic Party (PSD), as pre-candidate for Mayor. After the party convention in July, Matarazzo was confirmed as candidate for Vice Mayor with Marta Suplicy.

Matarazzo was a candidate for Mayor of São Paulo in the 2020 election.

In August 2022, Matarazzo announced his candidacy for the Italian Senate, representing the South American ovearsea constituency, running as a member of the Italian Socialist Party.

References

External links
 
 
 

|-

|-

|-

|-

|-

|-

1956 births
Living people
People from São Paulo
Italian Socialist Party (2007) politicians
Social Democratic Party (Brazil, 2011) politicians
Ambassadors of Brazil to Italy
Brazilian people of Italian descent